Katarzyna "Kasia" Wasick (born Wilk; 22 March 1992) is a Polish swimmer who specializes in sprint freestyle. Wasick represented Poland at the 2008, 2012, 2016, 2020 Summer Olympic Games in Beijing, London, Rio de Janeiro and Tokyo as well as other international meets. She is the fastest female swimmer in Poland holding national records in the 50 and 100 freestyle (short course & long course).

Career
After graduating from high school, Wasick trained in Poland with her brother Robert Wilk at the AZS AWF Katowice swim club before the 2012 Olympics in London. After the Olympic Games she went on to study at the University of Southern California where she swam for coach Dave Salo for four years. Wasick has shown great individual scoring ability while lending a strong hand on relays. She’s a twelve-time All-American and has scored four times individually at the NCAA Championships and is a six-time career Pac-12 finalist. At the 2016 NCAA Championships, she posted career bests with a third in the 100y freestyle. She also led off USC’s first place 400y free relay that set a school record. 

After the 2016 Olympics in Rio de Janeiro she retired from swimming due to injury. In 2018 she made a comeback to competitive swimming, first starting with the Las Vegas Masters team. She holds two American masters records in the 50 and 100 freestyle (25-29 age group short course yards records). Later in 2018 she joined the University of Nevada, Las Vegas Pro Group coached by Ben Loorz and Patrick Ota.

At the 2020 Olympic Games in Tokyo, Japan held in 2021 due to the COVID-19 pandemic, Wasick placed 5th in the 50m freestyle final. Later that year she won silver medals in the 50m and 100m freestyle as well as bronze medals in the 4x50 m freestyle relay and 4x50m mixed freestyle relay at the 2021 European Short Course Swimming Championships in Kazan, Russia. She finished the year earning a bronze medal in 50m freestyle at the 2021 World Short Course Swimming Championships in Abu Dhabi, United Arab Emirates in December. 

In 2022, she won the silver medal in the 50m freestyle at the 2022 World Aquatics Championships in Budapest becoming the second Polish female swimmer, after Otylia Jędrzejczak, to win a long course world championship medal.

International Swimming League

2019 
Wasick competed for the Cali Condors in the inaugural season of International Swimming League and reached the finals at Mandalay Bay in Las Vegas.

2020 
Kasia Wasick swam for the New York Breakers and reached the semi final. She won three times in the 50 m freestyle at the Solidarity Camp in Budapest.

2021 
She was drafted to compete for Toronto Titans as their first pick in the draft.

Personal life
Her father, Zbigniew Wilk, is a former boxer. Kasia has three siblings, two elder brothers who also practice swimming and a sister who competed in track and field. She says her brothers inspired and motivated her to take up swimming.  She received a bachelor's degree in psychology from the University of Southern California. She currently lives with her husband, Matthew Wasick, in Las Vegas.

See also
Poland at the Olympics
List of Polish swimmers

References

Polish female freestyle swimmers
Olympic swimmers of Poland
Swimmers at the 2008 Summer Olympics
Swimmers at the 2012 Summer Olympics
Swimmers at the 2016 Summer Olympics
Sportspeople from Kraków
1992 births
Living people
European Aquatics Championships medalists in swimming
Swimmers at the 2020 Summer Olympics
USC Trojans women's swimmers
World Aquatics Championships medalists in swimming
Medalists at the FINA World Swimming Championships (25 m)
20th-century Polish women
21st-century Polish women